Charles Chong You Fook (born 24 June 1953) is a Singaporean former politician who served as Deputy Speaker of the Parliament of Singapore between 2011 and 2020. He served as Acting Speaker of the Parliament of Singapore from 7 August to 11 September 2017, following the resignation of Halimah Yacob on 7 August 2017.

Education
Chong was educated at St. Michael's School and Saint Joseph's Institution before enrolling into University of California, San Diego where he studied orthopedic surgery.

Political career
Chong represented Sembawang Group Representation Constituency (GRC) in Yishun East from 1988 to 1991, Eunos GRC between 1991 and 1996 in Pasir Ris, Pasir Ris GRC in Elias from 1997 to 2001, Pasir Ris–Punggol GRC in Punggol Central from 2001 to 2011, Joo Chiat Single Member Constituency (SMC) from 2011 to 2015, and Punggol East SMC from 2015 to 2020.

In the 2006 general elections, the PAP contested Pasir Ris–Punggol GRC against the Singapore Democratic Alliance. The PAP won with 68.70% of the votes in this GRC. In the 2001 general elections, the GRC was not contested and resulted in a walkover for Chong and his party in this GRC.

Chong contested the Joo Chiat SMC in the 2011 general elections after its incumbent MP, Chan Soo Sen, retired from politics. He won 9,666 or 51.02% of the votes against Yee Jenn Jong from the Workers' Party. Chong was elected Deputy Speaker in the 12th Parliament.

In the 2015 general elections, the PAP fielded Chong in the opposition-held Punggol East SMC and unseated the incumbent Lee Li Lian of the Workers' Party with 51.76% of the vote. His victory was brought into question by Workers' Party Png Eng Huat because Chong had made a wild accusation against the Punggol East Town Council of missing funds worth $22.5 million just two days before polling day, it left the Workers' Party unable to respond in time due to the Cooling-off day restrictions of the Election Department.

In Dec 2016, Chong announced he was diagnosed with non-alcoholic steatohepatitis three years ago and had a liver transplant on 1 Dec 2016, which his younger son Glenn, donated part of his liver. He was given 8 weeks Medical Leave and his duty was covered by Teo Chee Hean during his absence.

On 11 January 2018, Chong was appointed chairman of the Select Committee on Deliberate Online Falsehoods. His appointment attracted controversy as he is accused of spreading falsehood during the 2015 general election by insinuating that Punggol East SMC ran into financial troubles after the Workers' Party took over from PAP in 2013.

He is the longest serving PAP back-bencher in Parliament and served as Deputy Speaker of Parliament of Singapore, as well as Acting Speaker when Halimah Yacob quit Parliament to stand for elected presidency.

Chong announced his retirement from politics on 27 June 2020.

Personal life
Chong is married and has two children. He is a Roman Catholic.

References

External links
CVs of MPs

1953 births
Saint Joseph's Institution, Singapore alumni
Members of the Parliament of Singapore
Peranakan people in Singapore
People's Action Party politicians
Living people
Singaporean Roman Catholics